Hibbard is a ghost town in Rosebud County, in the U.S. state of Montana.

History
A post office was established in Hibbard in 1912, and remained in operation until it was discontinued in 1924.  The town was named in honor of George W. Hibbard, a railroad agent.

References

Geography of Rosebud County, Montana
Ghost towns in Montana